Iné kafe is a Slovak punk rock band. The group was established in 1995 in Bratislava. The singer, guitarist and songwriter Vratko Rohoň is the frontman of the band. Their 2000 album Je Tu Niekto? received Platinum status for 20,000 albums sold in Slovakia. In 1999 they signed a contract with the Universal Music Group/PolyGram.

Members
Current members
 Vratko Rohoň - guitar (1995–present), lead vocals (1999–present)
 Jozef "Dodo" Praženec - drums (1995–2000, 2005 (S&V Tour), 2008–present)
 Vlado Bis – bass, backing vocals (2018-present)

Former members
 Majo Chromý – guitar, vocals 1995–1996
 Marek "Cibi" Cibula – vocals 1996–1999, S&V Tour 2005
 Noro Komada – drums 1995
 Tibor Prikler – guitar 2000–2002
 Dano Mathia – drums 2000–2003
 Jano Rozbora – drums 2003–2006 (except S&V Tour)
 Mario "Wayo" Praženec – bass 1995–2000, bass 2005 (S&V Tour), 2008–2011
 Roman "Hulo" Hulin - guitar (2011-2014), bass (2014–2016), backing vocals (2014–2016)
 Peter "Forus" Fóra – bass, vocals 2000–2014 (except S&V Tour), (2016-2018)

Guest musicians
 Richard Barger – bass (1995)
 Tomáš "YXO" Dohňanský – guitar (1998)
 Peter "FIXKY" Kudola – guitar (1999 Vitaj tour)
 Robo Bop The Pop – guitar (1999)
 Mára Fára – guitar
 Matej Turcer – guitar

Timeline

Discography

Albums
Vitaj! (1998)
Čumil (1999)
Je Tu Niekto? (2000)
Príbeh (2001)
Bez Udania Dôvodu (2003)
Právo Na Šťastie (2011)
Nevhodný Typ (2015)
Made In Czechoslovakia (2022)

Compilations
Najlepších 15 Rockov (2010)
22 Svetelných Rokov (Best Of) (2017)

Demo
Kachny (1996)
Situácia (1997)
Situácia & Kachny (reissue 2002)

Video
Live in Praha (2009)
25 Rokov Symphonic - Live In Bratislava (2021)

Singles and music videos (*)
 090x (1998, Vitaj!)*
 Závisť (1998, Vitaj!)
 Veľkou Palicou (1999, Vitaj!)
 Svätý Pokoj (1999, Čumil)
 Čumil (1999, Čumil)*
 Vianoce (1999, Čumil, 1999)*
 Kto Na To Príde? (2000, Je Tu Niekto?)*
 Úspešne Zapojení (2000, Je Tu Niekto?)*
 Ráno (2000, Je Tu Niekto?)*
 Mám Pocit… (2001, Je Tu Niekto?)*
 Kašovité Jedlá (2001, Príbeh)
 Ďakujeme Vám (2001, Príbeh)*
 Ružová Záhrada (2001, Príbeh)*
 Prečo Je To Tak? (2002, Príbeh)
 Záverečná (2002, Príbeh)
 Veľkou Palicou III (2003, Bez Udania Dôvodu)*
 Spomienky Na Budúcnosť (2003, Bez Udania Dôvodu)*
 Krvavá Blondína (2004, Bez Udania Dôvodu)*
 Alibi (2004, Bez Udania Dôvodu)*
 Svätý Pokoj (live) (2008)*
 Déjà Vu (studio version / live version*) (2010, Najlepších 15 Rockov)
 Mojich Najlepších 15 Rockov (normal version* / unplugged version) (2010, Najlepších 15 Rockov)
 Petra Po Rokoch (2011, Právo Na Šťastie)
 Ani Minútu (2011, Právo Na Šťastie)*
 Špinavé Objatie (2011, Právo Na Šťastie)*
 Právo Na Šťastie (2012, Právo Na Šťastie)*
 Figúrka (2012, Právo Na Šťastie)*
 Karanténa Citov (2013, Právo Na Šťastie)*
 Strom (2014)
 Nevhodný Typ (2014, Nevhodný Typ)*

References 

Slovak rock music groups
Musical groups established in 1995
Slovak punk rock groups
Slovak pop rock music groups
Pop punk groups